A Modern Life is the second studio album from the Los Angeles-based band Lo Moon. It was released on February 25, 2022.

Track listing

References

2022 albums
Lo Moon albums